Vertigo Cliffs is a spectacular, near vertical cliffs on the north coast of Vega Island. The cliffs rise to about 200 m and extend west for 7 nautical miles (13 km) from Cape Well-met, broken by a cirque near the west end. They were named allusively by the United Kingdom Antarctic Place-Names Committee (UK-APC) in 1987.

Cliffs of the James Ross Island group